Omar El-Nagdi (1931-2019) was an Egyptian abstract expressionist and cubist painter. On March 16, 2016, his 1992 painting Sarajevo was sold for $1,145,000.

References

1931 births
2019 deaths
Artists from Cairo
Helwan University alumni
20th-century Egyptian painters
21st-century Egyptian painters